David Teshager Dego (born 9 May 2001) is an Israeli footballer who currently plays as a midfielder for Hapoel Ramat HaSharon.

Career statistics

Club

Notes

References

2001 births
Living people
Israeli footballers
Association football midfielders
Beitar Jerusalem F.C. players
Hapoel Nir Ramat HaSharon F.C. players
Israeli Premier League players
Footballers from Ness Ziona
Jewish Israeli sportspeople
Israeli people of Ethiopian-Jewish descent
Sportspeople of Ethiopian descent